Carly Mitchell Telford (born 7 July 1987) is an English former professional footballer who played as a goalkeeper.

Club career
Telford joined Leeds United Ladies in 2007 from relegated club Sunderland. In May of that year she had turned out for Charlton Athletic in a tournament in Spain, but Charlton disbanded their women's team shortly afterwards. At Leeds, Telford was named player of the match in the 2008 FA Women's Cup final, after an impressive performance in Leeds' 4–1 defeat to Arsenal.

In summer 2010, Telford was called into the England squad as an unattached player, having left Leeds Carnegie. Matt Beard signed her for Chelsea Ladies ahead of the inaugural 2011 FA WSL season. In October 2012 it was announced that Telford would join Australian club Perth Glory for the 2012–13 winter season.

Telford left Chelsea after three years in December 2013, signing for Notts County ahead of the 2014 FA WSL season. There she was reunited with her former Leeds coach Rick Passmoor and she would have the opportunity to train with goalkeeper coach Kevin Pilkington. Chelsea coach Emma Hayes' decision to hand Telford a free transfer left her shocked and raging.

Telford was carrying a shoulder injury ahead of the 2015 FA Women's Cup Final and Notts County were angry when The Football Association refused their request for dispensation to sign another goalkeeper. Telford recovered to play in the team's 1–0 defeat by Chelsea at Wembley Stadium. She signed a two-year extension to her contract in November 2015.

In June 2016, Telford suffered torn ankle ligaments in a win over Doncaster Belles and was ruled out for three months. Notts County Ladies folded in April 2017 and Telford returned to Chelsea.

On 24 January 2022, Chelsea sold Telford to San Diego Wave FC of the National Women's Soccer League.

On 15 March 2023, Telford announced her retirement from football.

International career
Telford made her senior international debut on 11 March 2007 as a substitute against Scotland, having previously played at U17, U19, U21 and U23 levels.

In May 2009, Telford was one of the first 17 female players to be given central contracts by The Football Association.

In May 2015, Mark Sampson named Telford in his final squad for the 2015 FIFA Women's World Cup, hosted in Canada. England eventually finished in third place, but Telford was disappointed to be the only member of the squad not to play any minutes at the tournament.

In 2019, Telford was part of the England team that won the SheBelieves Cup in the United States, playing two of the three games against Brazil and Japan. Later that year, Telford was called up by Phil Neville to the 2019 World Cup squad. As part of England's social-media facing squad announcement, her name was announced by Sports Presenter Nicole Holliday.

Having been included in England squads for the 2007 FIFA Women's World Cup, 2015 FIFA Women's World Cup and UEFA Women's Euro 2017 without getting to play, Telford finally got her first minutes at a major tournament on 14 June 2019, starting in England's second group game at the 2019 FIFA Women's World Cup against Argentina.

Personal life
Telford attended Tanfield School, then Gateshead College on the Talented Athlete Scholarship Scheme.

In August 2010 her boyfriend was Matt Barron. Telford publicly came out in 2017. She is in a relationship with England cricketer Georgia Elwiss.

Career statistics

International
Statistics accurate as of match played 27 July 2021.

Honours
England
FIFA Women's World Cup third place: 2015
SheBelieves Cup: 2019

References

External links

 Carly Telford at the FA website
 Carly Telford Interview at the Keeper Portal Website
 Carly Telford at the San Diego Wave FC website
 
 
 

1987 births
Living people
Lesbian sportswomen
LGBT association football players
English LGBT sportspeople
English women's footballers
Leeds United Women F.C. players
Chelsea F.C. Women players
Sunderland A.F.C. Ladies players
San Diego Wave FC players
England women's international footballers
FA Women's National League players
Women's Super League players
Notts County L.F.C. players
2007 FIFA Women's World Cup players
2015 FIFA Women's World Cup players
Footballers from Newcastle upon Tyne
Women's association football goalkeepers
England women's under-23 international footballers
2019 FIFA Women's World Cup players
Footballers at the 2020 Summer Olympics
Olympic footballers of Great Britain
21st-century English LGBT people
English expatriate footballers
English expatriate sportspeople in the United States
Expatriate women's soccer players in the United States
UEFA Women's Euro 2017 players
National Women's Soccer League players